Utopia Falls is a Canadian TV series that combines science fiction with hip hop. Created by R.T. Thorne with Joseph Mallozzi as showrunner, the show premiered on the streaming service Hulu on February 14, 2020.

Plot
In the distant future, a colony of humans live in a city called New Babyl under a dome to protect them from the aftermath of a great war that killed all other life on Earth. The city is divided into four sectors—Progress, Industry, Nature, and Reform—and is ruled over by a governing authority known as the Tribunal.

A yearly performing arts contest called the Exemplar is held for teens who have turned 16. While competing, a group of the competitors discover an ancient archive hidden in the forest on the outskirts of New Babyl filled with forbidden historical, cultural and musical relics which forces them to question everything they have been taught.

Each sector in New Babyl has a distinctive coloured uniform that is a type of jumpsuit/overall. Progress citizens wear blue, Nature citizens wear green, Industry citizens wear Orange, and Reform citizens wear grey.

Cast

Main
Robyn Alomar as Aliyah 5, Exemplar candidate from Progress Sector
Akiel Julien as Bohdi 2, Exemplar candidate from Reform Sector
Robbie Graham-Kuntz as Tempo 3, Exemplar candidate from Progress Sector
Phillip Lewitski as Apollo 4, Exemplar candidate from Industry Sector
Humberly González as Brooklyn 2, Exemplar candidate from Industry Sector
Devyn Nekoda as Sage 5, Exemplar candidate from Nature Sector
Mickeey Nguyen as Mags 2, Exemplar candidate from Reform Sector
Kate Drummond as Authority Phydra, head of security for New Babyl
Jeff Teravainen as Gerald, father of Aliyah 5
Sean Baek as Ryden, member of the Tribunal of New Babyl
Snoop Dogg as The Archive (voice)

Recurring
Alexandra Castillo as Chancellor Diara, Chancellor of New Babyl
Husein Madhavji as Mentor Watts, mentor for The Exemplar
Corteon Moore as Kris 12
Kyal Legend as Sierra 5
Milton Barnes as Mentor Chapter, mentor for The Exemplar
Raven Dauda as Reia, member of the Tribunal of New Babyl
Jonathan Langdon as Regget
Stephanie Hood as Nada 4
Andrew Musselman as Authority Taggart
Dwain Murphy as Moore Times
Brenda Bazinet as Gran Riel, surrogate parent to Sage 5
Diane Johnstone as Gran Chyra, surrogate parent to Sage 5

Episodes

Production
Principal photography for the first season began in Toronto, Ontario, Canada, on March 1, 2019.

Development
Series creator R.T. Thorne says of the show:

Broadcast
Utopia Falls premiered on Hulu in the United States and CBC Gem in Canada on February 14, 2020 with all 10 episodes available to stream. It is not yet known if overseas territories that do not have access to Hulu or CBC Gem will broadcast the show.

Critical response
Review aggregation website Rotten Tomatoes gave season 1 an approval rating of 43%, with an average of 4.51/10 based on reviews from 14 critics. Metacritic gave the series an average score of 39 out of 100, based on reviews from 5 critics.

Tai Gooden of Nerdist compared the premise to that of the Hunger Games series and Divergent, and said: "it’s a musical sci-fi dystopian mystery/drama where kids try to dismantle a system through creative dance. It is both unlike anything on TV and exactly like a lot of what fans have seen before in terms of typical genre tropes. Daniel Fienberg of The Hollywood Reporter said: "think of Utopia Falls as a Child's First Guide to Dystopia and a Child's First Guide to Hip-Hop. It skews really young, really basic and really simplistic, but if you can accept how primitive and occasionally even amateurish it is, maybe you'll be able to fixate on the terrific soundtrack and promising young cast and ignore how many times you've seen basically this story delivered with vastly more polish.

Nicole Hill of Den of Geek wrote "Utopia Falls, Hulu’s latest TV series offering, has a premise straight out of young adult fiction. Every year, New Babyl hosts 'The Exemplar,' which sees twenty-four teenagers participate in a musical competition to win the title, and make history. It’s Divergent meets Step Up and how you feel about either or both of those franchises is probably a good barometer for how you will feel about Utopia Falls." Joel Keller of Decider said: "Hulu is billing Utopia Falls as 'the first ever sci-fi hip-hop television series,' and it’s easy to see why such a thing hasn’t been created before. Sci-fi has been a generally white genre, and one that’s more concerned with drama than dancing, singing and rapping. That may sound like we’re being wiseasses, but nothing could be further from the truth; the idea that a sci-fi show could be made from a younger, more diverse perspective is a welcome change. But is Utopia Falls that show?"

See also
 List of science fiction television programs
 List of science fiction TV and radio shows produced in Canada
 List of original programs distributed by Hulu

References

External links
  at Hulu
 

2020 Canadian television series debuts
2020s Canadian LGBT-related drama television series
2020s Canadian science fiction television series
Canadian science fiction web series
Dystopian television series
English-language television shows
Lesbian-related television shows
Television series about teenagers
Television series set in the future
Television shows filmed in Toronto
CBC Gem original programming
Hulu original programming
Hulu children's programming